Lieutenant General Sir Charles Alexander Anderson,  (10 February 1857 – 20 February 1940) was Commander of British Troops in South China.

Military career
Anderson was commissioned into the Royal Horse Artillery in 1876.

He took part in the Jowaki-Afridi expedition 1877, the Second Anglo-Afghan War in 1878 and the Burma expedition in 1885. He went to the North West Frontier in India in 1897. After the outbreak of the Second Boer War saw several senior officers posted to South Africa, Anderson was on 3 March 1900 temporary appointed assistant adjutant-general at head quarters Punjab Command. He was appointed assistant adjutant-general at Mandalay in June 1900, while still officiating in the Punjab, but never actually took up this position as he was appointed permanently to the job at Punjab head quarters on 20 May 1901, while also promoted to the substantive rank of colonel.

He was awarded the Albert Medal for an event at Ferozepore on 30 August 1906 when a fire broke out in one of the Magazines of the Ferozepore Arsenal. The citation reads:

He was appointed Commander of 1st Brigade for the Bazaar Valley expedition in 1908, and went on to be Commander of the Mohmand Field Force later that year. He was appointed Commander of British Troops in South China in 1910.

He served in the First World War as General Officer Commanding the Southern Army in India from 1917. He retired in 1920.

In 1921, he was conferred the Grand Cordon of the Order of the Sacred Treasure by the emperor of Japan.

Family
In 1893 he married Ellen Katherine Russell: they went on to have two sons.

References

|-
 

1857 births
1940 deaths
British Army lieutenant generals
Knights Commander of the Order of the Bath
Knights Commander of the Order of the Indian Empire
Recipients of the Albert Medal (lifesaving)
British Army generals of World War I
Royal Horse Artillery officers
British military personnel of the Third Anglo-Burmese War
British military personnel of the Second Anglo-Afghan War